The abbreviation COGAT or cogat (capitalization may vary) may refer to:
 Cognitive Abilities Test, an American student assessment test
 Coordinator of Government Activities in the Territories, an Israeli military office